Dalbergia setifera is a low growing shrub in the family Fabaceae.  It is found only in Ghana.
It is threatened by habitat loss.

References

Sources

setifera
Endemic flora of Ghana
Endangered flora of Africa
Taxonomy articles created by Polbot
Shrubs